Brundage is an unincorporated community and census-designated place (CDP) in Dimmit County, Texas, United States. The population was 27 at the 2010 census.

Geography
Brundage is located in northeastern Dimmit County at  (28.595243, -99.662611). Texas State Highway 85 passes through the community, leading west  to Carrizo Springs, the county seat, and east  to Big Wells.

Demographics
As of the census of 2000, there were 31 people, 7 households, and 5 families residing in the CDP. The population density was 1.3 people per square mile (0.5/km2). There were 14 housing units at an average density of 0.6/sq mi (0.2/km2). The racial makeup of the CDP was 67.74% White, 29.03% from other races, and 3.23% from two or more races. Hispanic or Latino of any race were 80.65% of the population.

There were 7 households, out of which 14.3% had children under the age of 18 living with them, 42.9% were married couples living together, 28.6% had a female householder with no husband present, and 14.3% were non-families. 14.3% of all households were made up of individuals, and none had someone living alone who was 65 years of age or older. The average household size was 4.43 and the average family size was 5.00.

In the CDP, the population was spread out, with 38.7% under the age of 18, 12.9% from 18 to 24, 22.6% from 25 to 44, 22.6% from 45 to 64, and 3.2% who were 65 years of age or older. The median age was 22 years. For every 100 females, there were 93.8 males. For every 100 females age 18 and over, there were 137.5 males.

The median income for a household in the CDP was $13,750, and the median income for a family was $13,750. Males had a median income of $0 versus $0 for females. The per capita income for the CDP was $2,371. There were 100.0% of families and 100.0% of the population living below the poverty line, including 100.0% of under 18 and none of those over 65.

Education
The CDP is served by the Carrizo Springs Consolidated Independent School District.

References

External links
 Handbook of Texas Online article about Brundage

Census-designated places in Texas
Census-designated places in Dimmit County, Texas
Unincorporated communities in Texas